Prestige is a Ugandan television drama series produced by Nathan Magooola and starring Nana Kagga, Cleopatra Koheirwe as Jazmine and Eunice respectively, two sisters and ad executives fighting to rise above each other. The series was commissioned by MultiChoice Uganda. It was produced under Ava Juliet productions and premiered on February 8, 2021, on Pearl Magic Prime channel at the launch of the channel.

Cast
Nana Kagga as Jazmine (Sn1)
 Elizabeth Bwamimpeke as Jasmine (Sn2 -)
Cleopatra Koheirwe as Eunice Kintu
Raymond Rushabiro as Milton
Evelyn Sandra Kironde as Chelsea Kintu
Karolyn Kash as Arianna Winstead
Symon Base Kalema as Jeje
 Martin "Yoyo" Nkoyoyo as Benefits
Joanitta Bewulira-Wandera
Daniel Omara

Awards and nominations

List of Episodes

Series overview
{| class="wikitable" style="text-align:center"
|-
! style="padding: 0 8px;" colspan="2" rowspan="2"| Season
! style="padding: 0 8px;" rowspan="2"| Episodes
! colspan="2"| Originally aired
|-
! style="padding: 0 8px;"| First aired
! style="padding: 0 8px;"| Last aired
|-
 |style="background: #F9BB00;"|
 | 1
 | 100
 | style="padding:0 8px;"| 
 | style="padding:0 8px;"| 
|- 
 |style="background: #A9BB00;"|
 | 2
 | 260
 | style="padding:0 8px;"| 
 | style="padding:0 8px;"| 
|-
 |style="background: #01AG00;"|
 | 3
 | TBA
 | style="padding:0 8px;"| 
 | style="padding:0 8px;"| TBA
|-

|}

References

External links

 

Ugandan drama television series
2021 Ugandan television series debuts
2020s Ugandan television series
Pearl Magic original programming